Kayseri Şekerspor is a football club located in Kayseri, Turkey.

History 
Kayseri Şekerspor was founded in 1956. The club has its origins in the Turkish Sugar Factories Inc. One of the factories is in Kayseri, producing sugar from sugar beet. The Turkey Sugar Factories logo is also incorporated in the club's logo. Kayseri Şekerspor promoted to the TFF Third League after the 2011–12 season. After three seasons the club relegated to the Turkish Regional Amateur League, finishing as 17th in the 3rd group of the TFF Third League. Kayseri Şekerspor opted out to take part in the Turkish Regional Amateur League 2018-19 season.

Stadium 
Currently the team plays at Kayseri Atatürk Spor Kompleksi Yan Açık Saha. Which has a capacity of 2,000.

League participations 
TFF Third League: 2012–2015
Turkish Regional Amateur League: 2010–2012, 2015–2018
 Amateurs: 2019-

References

External links 
Kayseri Şekerspor on TFF.org

Football clubs in Kayseri
Association football clubs established in 1956
Sport in Kayseri